Rhododendron thayerianum (反边杜鹃) is a rhododendron species native to western Sichuan in China, where it grows at altitudes of . The flowers are white, sometimes deeply flushed pink on the outside along the petal ridges, or pink. It flowers quite late in the season, in June and July.

References

 Rehder & E. H. Wilson in Sargent, Pl. Wilson. 1: 529. 1913.

thayerianum
Plants described in 1913